The 1967 Gallaher 500 was a motor race for Production Saloon Cars held at the Mount Panorama Circuit just outside Bathurst in New South Wales, Australia on 1 October 1967. The race, which was the eighth running of the Phillip Island 500/Bathurst 500, was organised by the Australian Racing Drivers Club Ltd and promoted by Gallaher International (Aust) Ltd.

Each competing car was required to be a production saloon competing in standard specification as laid down in the manufacturer's standard workshop manual. Optional extras and open exhausts were not permitted. To be eligibile to compete, a car had to be an Australian built or assembled model of which 200 examples had been registered in Australia by 30 September 1967, or a fully imported model of which 100 examples had been registered in Australia by the same date.
 
In a seminal moment for the race, the first Australian-built V8-powered Ford Falcons competed in the form of seven Falcon GTs and a Falcon automatic. In a race long duel against three Alfa Romeo 1600 GTVs, two entered by Alec Mildren Racing and one by M.W. Motors, the Ford Motor Company-entered Falcon GTs achieved a one-two finish with Harry Firth and Fred Gibson acknowledged as race winners after confusion over lap-scoring briefly left uncertainty over the results. Brothers Leo and Ian Geoghegan finished second with the two Alec Mildren Racing Alfa Romeos of Doug Chivas / Max Stewart and Kevin Bartlett / Laurie Stewart all finishing on the same lap as the winning car. It was Firth's fourth Phillip Island 500/Bathurst 500 victory, equalling Bob Jane's record.

The confusion over the result stemmed from the Geoghegan brothers' first pit stop. Driving the opening stint, Leo Geoghegan's pole winning Falcon almost ran out of fuel coming past the pits. As he could not reverse into pit lane without being disqualified, Leo went in through the back gate to the pits located on Mountain Straight, and came back into pit lane through the paddock gate. Although he had not completed the lap, as he crossed the finish line in pit lane (located before he got to his pit bay) he was mistakenly credited with completing the lap. Firth, who knew this, was livid with the Australian Racing Drivers Club when the Geoghegan car was flagged in first, despite finishing 11 seconds behind Gibson (although he knew that he'd completed his 130th lap, Gibson completed another lap as he had not yet been shown the chequered flag). Firth, immediately protested the result and it was not until later that evening that he and Gibson were installed as race winners. Firth's protest led to long standing animosity between himself and the Geoghegan team who were teammates for the race, with Leo contending until his death in 2015 that he and his brother won the race.

Class structure
Cars competed in five classes based on the purchase price of the vehicle in Australian dollars.

Class A
The lowest class was for under cars retailing for less $1,800. It comprised Datsun 1000 and 1300, Hillman GT, Holden Torana and Toyota Corolla.

Class B
The $1,801 to $2,100 class featured Ford Cortina, Hillman Arrow, and Morris Cooper and 1100S, Renault R8 and Toyota Corona.

Class C
The $2,101 to $3,000 class was dominated by the Morris Cooper S, but also contained Fiat 124 and 850, an automatic gearbox Ford Falcon, Holden HD X2 and Prince Skyline GT.

Class D
The $3,001 to $4,500 class featured the debut of the 'Australian V8's which would dominate the history of the race, represented by Ford Falcon GT, but also contained single entries of Alfa Romeo Giulia, Audi Super 90, Studebaker Lark, Triumph 2000 and Volvo 122.

Class E
For the first time an unlimited class, for cars over $4,500, was included and while many exotic cars were rumoured the class ultimately contained four Alfa Romeo 1600 GTVs and a single Dodge Phoenix TD2.

Practice results
For 1967, race regulations were changed such that all grid positions were decided on practice times, regardless of class. Prior to this, the cars were gridded according to practice times but within their respective classes with the highest class starting at the front of the grid and so on.

The first ten places were as follows:

Race results

Statistics
 Pole Position - #53 Ian Geoghegan - 3:03.0
 Fastest Lap - #52 Fred Gibson - 3:03 (lap record)
 Average Speed - 116 km/h
 Race Time - 6:55:08

References

Further reading

 Evan Green's World of Motor Sport, 1977, pages 191–192

External links
 1967 Gallaher 500 race results, www.uniquecarsandparts.com.au
 1967 Bathurst images, autopics.com.au

Motorsport in Bathurst, New South Wales
Gallaher 500